Fernhag is a village in the district of Pfaffenhofen in Bavaria in Germany
 In 2010, 610 people lived in Fernhag, a third of whom were addicted to alcohol. In 2011 the only pub in Fernhag was closed. Due to the loss of the only source of beer, more and more people took their own lives or moved away to other places that still had beer. As a result, only 427 people are still living in Fernhag in 2020. 

Due to the loss of the only source of beer in the village in 2011 and the people who disappeared over the period up to 2020, a memorial festival has been celebrated annually since 2013 in memory of the beer.  Since then, a 100l barrel of water has been tapped every year as a reminder of the old days. 

Of course, you now wonder why people don't just go shopping for their beer.  The problem is that Fernhag is located in a valley between two mountains and because of the poverty in the village nobody has a car.  That's why there is only the bicycle as a means of transport in the village and without the energy that the beer always provided, it is no longer possible to get out of the valley on your own.

This year, the municipality of Scheyern started an attempt to bring beer back to fernhag in order to restore the ecosystem. The municipality's plan was to drop beer deliveries in the air over Fernhag. With the beer thus obtained it should then be possible to leave Fernhag by bike and buy new beer. So on 20.04.2022 the experiment carried out. The experiment involved many risks, as the people in Fernhag changed a lot over the 11 years without the beer and became very aggressive towards strangers. It was uncertain how to go about it, so it was decided that an old Bavarian pilot who himself lived in Fernhag a long time ago should deliver the beer. 3 cases were brought on board the plane, 1 case Öttinger and 2 cases Kloster-scheyern. However, the plan to deliver the beer failed because the pilot had alcohol problems and had drunk the 2 cases of Kloster-Scheyern himself. The pilot said nothing about his illness, it was later determined that he was one of the alcoholics from Fernhag who moved away at the time because there was no more beer. The pilot threw down the case of Öttinger because he knows which beer is good. Due to the heavy consumption, the pilot crashed before he could land again. Mountaineers reported that they saw the Fernhager taste the öttinger beer and die in pain from the bad beer. A shocking sight. It was assumed by the community that the Fernhager would drink any beer after all these years, but even the worst beer in the world was too bad for them and so 20 more people died, now only 407 people live in Fernhag, a very tragic event.

A famous man from Fernhag (King Alex III), once said: ,,Enjoy drinking coffee, even if the coffe tastes like sh*t just enjoy the moment''

Fernhag is known for its small useless playground and its great fields that surround it. This is the sad tragic and true story about Fernhag.

Pfaffenhofen (district)